John Leslie (14 October 1571 – 8 September 1671) was a combative Scottish royalist bishop of Clogher, who became known as the "fighting bishop" for his resistance to the Irish rebellion of 1641 and the parliamentarian forces. He is also notable for almost reaching the age of 100.

Life

The oldest son of George Leslie and Marjory, his wife, he was born at Crichie in Aberdeenshire, 14 October 1571. He was educated at Aberdeen and afterwards in France. He lived abroad for two decades, mainly in Spain, where his Latinity was admired. He was admitted to read in the Bodleian Library in 1618, and in 1624 he graduated Doctor of Divinity (DD) at Trinity College, Cambridge, per literas regias. He was in favour with James I of England, who made him a privy councillor in Scotland, and with Charles I of England, who gave him the same rank in Ireland, and this he retained after the Restoration of Charles II. He was with George Villiers, 1st Duke of Buckingham at Rhé in 1627.

His first preferment seems to have been in London to the church of St. Martins-in-the-Vintry, and he was promoted to be Bishop of the Isles in 1628. In June 1633 he was translated to the bishopric of Raphoe in Ireland. Here he found many of the mensal lands in the hands of lay usurpers, but recovered some by a lawsuit. In 1635 he had a dispute with one John Hamilton, in which John Bramhall, at Thomas Wentworth's request, undertook to arbitrate. He built a fortified palace at Raphoe, where there had been no episcopal mansion.

The outbreak of the Irish Rebellion of 1641 tested the defences of the palace. The bishop raised a company of foot for the king, distinguished himself as a partisan leader, and conveyed ammunition through from Dublin to Derry. He relieved Sir Ralph Gore, who was hard beset at Magherabeg, near Donegal. Leslie is said to have gone to Scotland about midsummer 1642, all the other bishops having previously left Ireland; but he returned after the king's execution, defended Raphoe against the Cromwellians as he had done against the Irish, and was one of the last royalists to submit.

Leslie was the only Anglican bishop who remained at his post in Ireland during the Interregnum, confirming children in Dublin, and ordaining clergymen. Leslie's courtly manners endeared him to Henry Cromwell, and he was for a time in receipt of a pension. To do homage to the Restoration in 1660, Leslie, then nearly ninety, is said to have ridden from Chester to London in twenty-four hours. He was allowed to hold the deanery of Raphoe along with his bishopric, but resigned it on being translated to Clogher in June 1661. The bishop was recommended by Charles II to the special consideration of the Irish House of Commons, and £2,000 were voted to him. In returning thanks, he hoped 'that whatever the house hath given to a prophet may receive a prophet's reward'.

He bought Glasslough in Monaghan; it was one of the many forfeited estates which had been granted to Sir Thomas Ridgeway. The Leslie family historian says that the bishop's wife was heiress of Glasslough. The town was long known as Castle-Leslie. At his death on 8 September 1671, he transmitted his estate to his children. He was buried there in the church of St. Saviour, which he had founded. The slab which covered his remains recorded that the bishop died a centenarian, that he was a doctor of divinity and laws, and that he was a privy councillor to three kings. Bishop Maxwell of Kilmore composed an epitaph.

Family

In 1638 the bishop was married to Catherine, daughter of Alexander Cunningham, Dean of Raphoe and Marian Murray, who was aged eighteen. She is said to have been one of twenty-seven children. They had ten children, of whom John, the eldest surviving son, was dean of Dromore. The sixth son was Charles Leslie the nonjuror, whose great-grandson was John Leslie, Bishop of Kilmore, Elphin and Ardagh (son of Charles Leslie MP).

References

Attribution

External links
Significant Scots: John Leslie. ElectricScotland.com

1571 births
1671 deaths
17th-century Ministers of the Church of Scotland
Bishops of the Isles
Anglican bishops of Raphoe
Bishops of Clogher (Church of Ireland)
17th-century Anglican bishops in Ireland
Members of the Parliament of Scotland 1628–1633
Members of the Convention of the Estates of Scotland 1630